Gerard Barrett may refer to:
Gerard Barrett (runner) (born 1956), Australian long-distance runner
Gerard Barrett (director) (born 1987), Irish director
Gerard Barrett (footballer) (1925–2000), Australian rules football player